Plants of the World Online currently includes the following species in genus Amomum:

 Amomum alborubellum K.Schum. & Lauterb.
 Amomum andamanicum V.P.Thomas, Dan & M.Sabu
 Amomum apiculatum K.Schum.
 Amomum aquaticum Raeusch.
 Amomum argyrophyllum Ridl.
 Amomum bicornutum Ridl.
 Amomum bilabiatum S.Sakai & Nagam.
 Amomum billburttii Skornick. & Hlavatá
 Amomum biphyllum (Saensouk & P.Saensouk) Skornick. & Hlavatá
 Amomum calcicola Lamxay & M.F.Newman
 Amomum carnosum V.P.Thomas & M.Sabu
 Amomum centrocephalum A.D.Poulsen
 Amomum cephalotes Ridl.
 Amomum chaunocephalum K.Schum.
 Amomum chayanianum (Yupparach) Skornick. & Hlavatá
 Amomum chevalieri Gagnep. ex Lamxay
 Amomum chong-eui (C.K.Lim) Skornick. & Hlavatá
 Amomum chryseum Lamxay & M.F.Newman
 Amomum conoideum (Ridl.) Elmer
 Amomum curtisii (Baker) Skornick. & Hlavatá
 Amomum dampuianum V.P.Thomas, M.Sabu & Lalramngh.
 Amomum dealbatum Roxb.
 Amomum deuteramomum K.Schum.
 Amomum diphyllum (K.Schum.) Skornick. & Hlavatá
 Amomum dolichanthum D.Fang
 Amomum echinatum Willd.
 Amomum elan (C.K.Lim) Skornick. & Hlavatá
 Amomum exertum (Scort.) Skornick. & Hlavatá
 Amomum flavorubellum K.Schum. & Lauterb.
 Amomum fragile S.Q.Tong
 Amomum fragrans Skornick. & Hlavatá
 Amomum garoense S.Tripathi & V.Prakash
 Amomum glabrum S.Q.Tong
 Amomum globba J.F.Gmel.
 Amomum gymnopodum K.Schum.
 Amomum hainanense Y.S.Ye, J.P.Liao & P.Zou
 Amomum hochreutineri Valeton
 Amomum hypoleucum Thwaites
 Amomum irosinense (Elmer) Merr.
 Amomum johorense (C.K.Lim) Skornick. & Hlavatá
 Amomum kerbyi (R.M.Sm.) Skornick. & Hlavatá
 Amomum kingii Baker
 Amomum kwangsiense D.Fang & X.X.Chen
 Amomum lacteum Ridl.
 Amomum lagarophyllum Skornick. & Hlavatá
 Amomum laoticum Gagnep.
 Amomum latiflorum (Ridl.) Skornick. & Hlavatá
 Amomum limianum (Picheans. & Yupparach) Skornick. & Hlavatá
 Amomum longipes Valeton
 Amomum longipetiolatum Merr.
 Amomum lophophorum (Ridl.) Elmer
 Amomum luzonense Elmer
 Amomum macrodons Scort.
 Amomum maximum Roxb.
 Amomum meghalayense V.P.Thomas, M.Sabu & Sanoj
 Amomum menglaense S.Q.Tong
 Amomum mengtzense H.T.Tsai & P.S.Chen
 Amomum microcheilum (Ridl.) Merr.
 Amomum mizanianum (C.K.Lim) Skornick. & Hlavatá
 Amomum monophyllum Gagnep.
 Amomum nemorale (Thwaites) Trimen
 Amomum nimkeyense M.Sabu, Hareesh, Tatum & A.K.Das
 Amomum odontocarpum D.Fang
 Amomum pauciflorum Baker
 Amomum pellitum Ridl.
 Amomum petaloideum (S.Q.Tong) T.L.Wu
 Amomum plicatum Lamxay & M.F.Newman
 Amomum poonsakianum (Picheans. & Yupparach) Skornick. & Hlavatá
 Amomum prionocarpum Lamxay & M.F.Newman
 Amomum procurrens Gagnep.
 Amomum pterocarpum Thwaites
 Amomum puberulum (Ridl.) Skornick. & Hlavatá
 Amomum purpureorubrum S.Q.Tong & Y.M.Xia
 Amomum putrescens D.Fang
 Amomum queenslandicum R.M.Sm.
 Amomum ranongense (Picheans. & Yupparach) Skornick. & Hlavatá
 Amomum repoeense Pierre ex Gagnep.
 Amomum riwatchii M.Sabu & Hareesh
 Amomum robertsonii Craib
 Amomum rugosum (Y.K.Kam) Skornick. & Hlavatá
 Amomum sabuanum V.P.Thomas, Nissar & U.Gupta
 Amomum schlechteri K.Schum.
 Amomum sericeum Roxb.
 Amomum siamense Craib
 Amomum slahmong (C.K.Lim) Skornick. & Hlavatá
 Amomum smithiae (Y.K.Kam) Skornick. & Hlavatá
 Amomum stenocarpum Valeton
 Amomum stenosiphon K.Schum.
 Amomum subcapitatum Y.M.Xia
 Amomum subulatum Roxb.
 Amomum sumatranum (Valeton) Skornick. & Hlavatá
 Amomum tephrodelphys K.Schum.
 Amomum terminale Ridl.
 Amomum trianthemum K.Schum.
 Amomum trichanthera Warb.
 Amomum trilobum Gagnep.
 Amomum unifolium Gagnep.
 Amomum velutinum X.E.Ye, Skornick. & N.H.Xia
 Amomum wandokthong (Picheans. & Yupparach) Skornick. & Hlavatá
 Amomum warburgianum K.Schum. & Lauterb.
 Amomum warburgii (K.Schum.) K.Schum.
 Amomum yingjiangense S.Q.Tong & Y.M.Xia

References 

 GBIF entry for Amomum species

Amomum
Amomum